A legal doublet is a standardized phrase used frequently in English legal language consisting of two or more words that are irreversible binomials and frequently synonyms, usually connected by "and", such as "null and void". The order of the words cannot be reversed, as it would be particularly unusual to ask someone to desist and cease or to have property owned clear and free; these common legal phrases are universally known as cease and desist and free and clear.

The doubling—and sometimes even tripling—often originates in the transition from use of one language for legal purposes to another: in Britain, from a native English term to a Latin or Law French term; in Romance-speaking countries, from Latin to the vernacular.  To ensure understanding, the terms from both languages were used. This reflected the interactions between Germanic and Roman law following the decline of the Roman Empire. These phrases are often pleonasms and form irreversible binomials.

In other cases the two components have differences which are subtle, appreciable only to lawyers, or obsolete. For example, ways and means, referring to methods and resources respectively, are differentiable, in the same way that tools and materials, or equipment and funds, are differentiable—but the difference between them is often practically irrelevant to the contexts in which the irreversible binomial ways and means is used today in non-legal contexts as a mere cliché. 

Doublets may also have arisen or persisted because the solicitors and clerks who drew up conveyances and other documents were paid by the word, which tended to encourage verbosity.

Their habitual use has been decried by some legal scholars as superfluous in modern legal briefs.

List of common legal doublets

 accord and satisfaction
 acknowledge and confess
 aid and abet
 all and sundry
 alter or change
 appropriate and proper
 art and part
 assault and battery
 bind and obligate
 breaking and entering
 butts and bounds
 by and between
 care and attention
 cease and desist
 covenant and agree
 deem and consider
 demise and lease
 depose and say
 due and payable
 expressed or implied
 facts and circumstances
 final and conclusive
 fit and proper
 for and on behalf of
 free and clear
 from now and henceforth
 full faith and credit
 furnish and supply
 goods and chattels
 have and hold
 heirs and successors
 high crimes and misdemeanors
 hue and cry
 indemnify and hold harmless
 infangthief and outfangthief
 keep and perform
 kind and nature
 law and order
 legal and valid
 let or hindrance
 lewd and lascivious conduct
 liens and encumbrances
 make and enter into
 marque and reprisal
metes and bounds
 mind and memory
 null and void
 over and above
 part and parcel
 perform and discharge
 power and authority
 sac and soc
 sale or transfer
 signed and sealed
 sole and exclusive
 successor and assigns
 terms and conditions
 then and in that event
 toll and team
 true and correct
 waif and stray
 ways and means
 will and testament

List of common legal triplets

 arbitrary, capricious and unreasonable
 cancel, annul and set aside
 convey, transfer and set over
 give, devise and bequeath
 grant, bargain and sell
 name, constitute and appoint
 null, void and of no effect
 ordered, adjudged and decreed
 remise, release and forever quit claim
 rest, residue and remainder
 right, title and interest
 signed, sealed and delivered
 way, shape or form

See also

 Hendiadys
 Legal English
 Merism

References

Legal terminology
Legal writing